Odrie is a former municipality in the Gjirokastër County, southern Albania. At the 2015 local government reform it became a subdivision of the municipality Gjirokastër. The population at the 2011 census was 433. The municipal unit consists of the villages Andon Poçi, Hundëkuq, Tërbuq, Labovë e Madhe and Labovë e Vogël.

References

Former municipalities in Gjirokastër County
Administrative units of Gjirokastër